Aleksandrów  is a village in the administrative district of Gmina Iłów, within Sochaczew County, Masovian Voivodeship, in east-central Poland.

References

Villages in Sochaczew County